Takapu Valley, one of the northern suburbs of Wellington, New Zealand, is a rural area. The only road, Takapu Road, which runs by the Takapu Stream, goes down past Grenada North to the intersection with the Johnsonville-Porirua Motorway, and to Tawa where most facilities are. There is a supermarket and the Takapu Road Railway Station near the motorway intersection, but neither are in the valley itself.

History 
The valley was settled in the 19th century, when country sections were sold by the New Zealand Company, many to absentee landowners. An early farmer was John Edwards who arrived in Wellington on the ‘’Catherine Stewart Forbes’’with his wife Phoebe and eight children in 1841. Three of their sons Edward, Thomas and William farmed in the valley.

Access was via the Old Porirua Road which passed the entrance to Takapu Valley.

The Takapu Road School operated from the 1890s to the 1920s.

James and Lionel Nairn transferred their dairy herd to Takapu Road in the 1920s, as in Khandallah (and Ngaio) houses were replacing the remaining farms.

In 2017 the Woodman Farm in Takapu Valley which had been in the same family for 150 years was up for sale.

Demographics

Takapu Valley

Statistical area 7021150 covers Takapu Valley, and has an area of  It had a population of 87 at the 2018 New Zealand census, an increase of 15 people (20.8%) since the 2013 census, and an increase of 3 people (3.6%) since the 2006 census. There were 27 households. There were 48 males and 42 females, giving a sex ratio of 1.14 males per female. The median age was 39.5 years (compared with 37.4 years nationally), with 24 people (27.6%) aged under 15 years, 15 (17.2%) aged 15 to 29, 45 (51.7%) aged 30 to 64, and 6 (6.9%) aged 65 or older.

Ethnicities were 96.6% European/Pākehā, 6.9% Māori, 0.0% Pacific peoples, 0.0% Asian, and 6.9% other ethnicities (totals add to more than 100% since people could identify with multiple ethnicities).

Although some people objected to giving their religion, 41.4% had no religion, 37.9% were Christian and 3.4% had other religions.

Of those at least 15 years old, 15 (23.8%) people had a bachelor or higher degree, and 6 (9.5%) people had no formal qualifications. The median income was $38,800, compared with $31,800 nationally. The employment status of those at least 15 was that 42 (66.7%) people were employed full-time, 12 (19.0%) were part-time, and 3 (4.8%) were unemployed.

Takapu-Horokiwi

Takapu-Horokiwi had a population of 273 at the 2018 New Zealand census, an increase of 27 people (11.0%) since the 2013 census, and an increase of 15 people (5.8%) since the 2006 census. There were 96 households. There were 144 males and 129 females, giving a sex ratio of 1.12 males per female. The median age was 44 years (compared with 37.4 years nationally), with 54 people (19.8%) aged under 15 years, 36 (13.2%) aged 15 to 29, 156 (57.1%) aged 30 to 64, and 24 (8.8%) aged 65 or older.

Ethnicities were 89.0% European/Pākehā, 7.7% Māori, 0.0% Pacific peoples, 4.4% Asian, and 5.5% other ethnicities (totals add to more than 100% since people could identify with multiple ethnicities).

The proportion of people born overseas was 24.2%, compared with 27.1% nationally.

Although some people objected to giving their religion, 49.5% had no religion, 29.7% were Christian, 1.1% were Muslim and 3.3% had other religions.

Of those at least 15 years old, 78 (35.6%) people had a bachelor or higher degree, and 24 (11.0%) people had no formal qualifications. The median income was $43,100, compared with $31,800 nationally. The employment status of those at least 15 was that 135 (61.6%) people were employed full-time, 33 (15.1%) were part-time, and 3 (1.4%) were unemployed.

References

Suburbs of Wellington City